A hemi-octahedron is an abstract regular polyhedron, containing half the faces of a regular octahedron.

It has 4 triangular faces, 6 edges, and 3 vertices. Its dual polyhedron is the hemicube.

It can be realized as a projective polyhedron (a tessellation of the real projective plane by 4 triangles), which can be visualized by constructing the projective plane as a hemisphere where opposite points along the boundary are connected and dividing the hemisphere into four equal parts.  It can be seen as a square pyramid without its base.

It can be represented symmetrically as a hexagonal or square Schlegel diagram:

It has an unexpected property that there are two distinct edges between every pair of vertices – any two vertices define a digon.

See also 
Hemi-dodecahedron
Hemi-icosahedron

References

External links
 The hemioctahedron

Projective polyhedra